The European Lacrosse Championships began in 1995, the same year as the founding of the European Lacrosse Federation (ELF), to determine the best national lacrosse team of Europe. The men's tournament was held that first year, with the women following in 1996. Through 2001, the Championships were annual events. Since 2004 the men's tournament has been held every four years. The women have played in 2003, 2004, 2008, 2012 and 2015.

Men's competition

Finals

Performances by team

Women's competition

Finals

Performance by team

References
 
 

 
Recurring sporting events established in 1995
Quadrennial sporting events
1995 establishments in Europe
Women's lacrosse competitions